The discography of the English singer, songwriter and recording artist Marc Almond consists of music recorded since the late 1970s. He has recorded as a solo artist and with several other groups, these include Soft Cell, Marc & the Mambas, The Willing Sinners and Flesh Volcano. He has also worked with Michael Cashmore, and has contributed to numerous one-off releases with a variety of artists.

Soft Cell

Marc and the Mambas

Solo

Studio albums

Live albums

Compilation albums
 Singles 1984 – 1987 (1987, Some Bizarre Virgin)  (compilation of singles from The Willing Sinners era)
 Memorabilia – The Singles (1991, Some Bizarre Mercury) (as Soft Cell and Marc Almond)  No. 8 UK
 A Virgin's Tale – Volume I (1992, Some Bizarre Virgin) (1985–1987 B-sides & remixes from The Willing Sinners era)
 A Virgin's Tale – Volume II (1992, Some Bizarre Virgin) (1986–1987 B-sides from the Mother Fist album era)
 Treasure Box (1995, EMI, Some Bizzare) (1988–1990 B-sides, rarities & remixes compilation)
 Flesh Volcano•Slut (1997, Some Bizarre) (as The Flesh Volcano, a side project with the group Foetus, re-issue of the EP with bonus tracks)
 Violent Silence / A Woman's Story (1997, Some Bizarre) (two EPs plus two exclusive compilation tracks) 
 Little Rough Rhinestones Volume 1 (2002, Blue Star Music) (Official website release)
 In Session Volume 1 (2003, Some Bizzare BBC/Strange Fruit)
 In Session Volume 2 (2003, Some Bizzare BBC/Strange Fruit)
 Little Rough Rhinestones Volume 2 (2006, Blue Star Music) (Official website release)
 Trials of Eyeliner: Anthology 1979–2016 (2016, UMC)
 Hits & Pieces (2017, UK Chart No.7)

Extended plays
 A Woman's Story (Some Songs to Take to the Tomb – Compilation One) (1986, Some Bizzare Virgin) (mini album)
 Violent Silence (1986, Some Bizzare) (mini album)
 Slut (1987, Some Bizarre) (as The Flesh Volcano)
 Brel Extras (2008, Blue Star Music) (official website release)
 Nijinski Heart EP (2010, Strike Force Entertainment Cherry Red) (download release)
 Tasmanian Tiger EP (2014, Strike Force Entertainment Cherry Red)
 Things We Lost (2022, Cherry Red)

Singles

Other releases

Exclusive / fan club releases

Guest appearances and contributions (singles)

Guest appearances and contributions (album tracks)

Videos

Video albums

Music videos

Film / soundtrack appearances

Books
 1988 The Angel of Death in the Adonis Lounge (poems)
 1999 Beautiful Twisted Night (poems, lyrics and prose)
 1999 Tainted Life (autobiography, reprinted in paperback in 2000)
 2001 The End of New York (poems and prose, including spoken word CD)
 2004 In Search of the Pleasure Palace – Disreputable Travels (autobiography)

References

Discographies of British artists